Lawrence Douglas "Larry" Mavety (29 May 1942 – 4 December 2020) was a Canadian professional ice hockey player, and former coach and executive in the Ontario Hockey League (OHL), with both the Belleville Bulls and the Kingston Frontenacs.

Playing career

Toledo Blades (1963-1964)
Mavety starting his minor league hockey career in 1963–64 season as a defenceman with the Toledo Blades of the International Hockey League (IHL), recording 20 points (7G-13A), along with 133 PIM in 70 games, and helped the Blades have the best record in the league. He added two points (1G-1A) in 13 playoff games as the Blades won the Turner Cup.

Port Huron Flags (1964-1967)
After starting the 1964–65 with the Syracuse Stars, an independent team, Mavety returned to the IHL with the Port Huron Flags, earning 18 points (4G-14A) in 23 games, and he added an assist in seven playoff games. Mavety returned in 1965–66, and recorded 62 points (19G-43A) in 69 games with the Flags, and added 12 points (3G-9A) in nine playoff games as the Flags won the Turner Cup. Following the season, Mavety was named to the IHL Second All-Star Team. In 1966–67, Mavety again improved his numbers with 73 points (25G-48A) in 71 games with Port Huron, as he won the Governor's Trophy as the best defenceman in the IHL and was named to the IHL First All-Star Team. Despite his great season, the Flags did not qualify for the playoffs.

Vancouver Canucks (1967-1968)
In 1967–68, Mavety joined the Vancouver Canucks of the Western Hockey League (WHL), and he recorded 25 points (2G-23A), along with 148 PIM in 72 games, as the Canucks failed to make the playoffs.

Denver Spurs (1968-1971)
Mavety moved on with the Denver Spurs, of the WHL, and in his first season with the team, Mavety had 33 points (5G-28A) in 74 games as the team did not make the playoffs. In 1969–70, Mavety recorded 57 points (10G-47A) in 72 games, and again the Spurs failed to make the playoffs. Mavety was named to the WHL Second All-Star Team after the season. Mavety returned to Denver for the 1970–71 season, and finished second in team scoring with 63 points (18G-45A) in 71 games as the Spurs qualified for the playoffs. He added four points in five playoff games. Mavety was named to the WHL Second All-Star Team for the second consecutive season in 1971.

Salt Lake Golden Eagles (1971-1972)
In 1971–72, Mavety joined the Salt Lake Golden Eagles, and recorded 53 points (15G-38A) in 62 games. The Eagles failed to qualify for the post-season.

Los Angeles Sharks (1972-1973)
With the World Hockey Association (WHA) beginning play in 1972–73, Mavety began the season with the Los Angeles Sharks, however he played only two games with the club, scoring a goal.

Philadelphia Blazers (1972-1973)
Mavety moved on to the Philadelphia Blazers, where he went pointless in four games during the 1972–73 season.

Chicago Cougars (1972-1975)
Mavety found a home with the Chicago Cougars in 1972–73, where he had 49 points (9G-40A) in 67 games. He returned to the Cougars for the 1973–74 season, registering 51 points (15G-36A) in 77 games and helped the club make the post-season. The Cougars then upset the defending champion New England Whalers in the division semi-finals, then beat heavily favoured Toronto Toros in the division finals before losing to the Houston Aeros in the Avco Cup Finals.  Mavety had 12 points (4G-8A) in 18 playoff games.

In 1974–75, Mavety earned 32 points (10G-22A) in 57 games with the Cougars.  He also spent a few games with the Long Island Cougars of the North American Hockey League (NAHL), playing in four games and scoring two goals before being traded to the Toronto Toros.

Toronto Toros (1974-1975)
He played in 17 games with the Toros, recording nine points (0G-9A), helping them to the playoffs. In six playoff games, Mavety registered three assists as the Toros lost in the first round.

Denver Spurs (1975-1976)
Mavety split the 1975–76 season between the Erie Blades of the NAHL, getting 24 points (7G-17A) in 24 games, the Broome Dusters, also of the NAHL, recording 36 points (14G-22A) in 31 games, and the Denver Spurs of the WHA, getting four points (0G-4A) in 14 games.

Indianapolis Racers (1976-1977)
He then spent the majority of the 1976–77 season with the Dusters again, getting 67 points (16G-51A) in 59 games, and he also spent 10 games with the Indianapolis Racers of the WHA, getting four points (2G-2A).  With the Dusters in the playoffs, Mavety had 10 points (1G-9A) in 10 games.  Mavety then retired from professional hockey after the season.

Career statistics

Coaching career

Belleville Bulls (1979-1988)
In 1979–80, Mavety was hired by the Belleville Bulls, an expansion junior tier II team in the OHA.  He led the club to a 24–18–2 record.  In 1980–81, he led the Bulls to a 35–7–2 record, as the team won the league championship, defeating the Guelph Platers.  The Bulls then went on to play for the national championship for the Manitoba Centennial Trophy, losing to the Prince Albert Raiders in the final game.

In 1981–82, the Bulls moved to the Ontario Hockey League (OHL) as an expansion team, where they finished the year with a 24–42–2 record, and missed the playoffs.  In 1982–83, the Bulls improved to a 34–36–0 record and qualified for the playoffs for the first time, as the club lost to the Oshawa Generals in the first round.  In 1983–84, the Bulls had a 33–37–0 record, making the playoffs again, and lost in the first round to the Generals again.

In 1984–85, the Bulls had their first winning season with a 42–24–0 record.  They had another rematch against the Generals, this time beating them in five games.  In the second round, they got past the Cornwall Royals, before falling to the Peterborough Petes in the division finals.

The 1985–86 Bulls had another winning season, this time with a 37–27–2 record.  The Bulls defeated Cornwall in the 1st round, tied with Peterborough in a round-robin matchup against the Kingston Canadians, defeated Peterborough in the division finals, before losing to the Guelph Platers in the J. Ross Robertson Cup finals.

The 1986–87 season was a rebuilding one for the Bulls, who had a 26–39–1 record, and lost to Kingston in the first round.  In 1987–88, the Bulls rebounded with a 32–30–4 record, but again lost in the first round, this time to Cornwall.

Kingston Raiders/Frontenacs (1988-1990)
In 1988 Mavety left the Bulls and joined the Kingston Raiders as the head coach.  The club finished the 1988–89 season with a 25–36–5 record, failing to qualify for the playoffs.  In the summer of 1989, the Raiders were renamed to the Kingston Frontenacs, and in 1989–90, the Frontenacs finished with a 42–21–3 record, and Mavety won the OHL Coach of the Year award.  The Fronts had a disappointing playoff though, losing in seven games in the opening round to Mavety's former team, the Belleville Bulls.

Belleville Bulls (1990-1997)
For the 1990–91 season, Mavety returned to coach the Bulls, who finished with a 38–21–7 record, and lost to the Ottawa 67's in the first round of the playoffs.  In 1991–92, the Bulls fell to a 27–27–12 record, losing to the North Bay Centennials in the opening round.  The 1992–93 Bulls had a rough season, finishing with a 21–34–11 record, and lost to the Generals in the first round.

In 1993–94, the Bulls finished with a winning record, with a 32–28–6 record, and defeated the Frontenacs in the first round, the first time since 1986 that Mavety won a playoff round.  The Bulls then fell to the Centennials in the second round.  The 1994–95 Bulls had a 32–31–3 record, and won their opening round against North Bay, then defeated Kingston before losing to the Guelph Storm in the third round.  In 1995–96, Belleville had a 35–26–5 record, and defeated Oshawa in the first round, Ottawa in the second round, before falling to Guelph in the third round. in 1996–97, the Bulls slumped to a 22–37–7 record, and lost to Ottawa in the first round.

Kingston Frontenacs (1997-2020)
In 1997, Mavety returned to the Kingston Frontenacs as head coach and general manager. The club finished the 1997-98 season with a 35–27–4, earning 74 points, and placing in third place in the East Division. Kingston won their opening round playoff series, defeating the Oshawa Generals in seven games, before falling to the London Knights in the second round.

Kingston struggled to a 22-42-4 record during the 1998-99 season, however, the club reached the post-season in the eighth seed in the Eastern Conference. In the post-season, the Frontenacs lost to the first place Barrie Colts in the Eastern Conference quarter-finals.

During the summer of 1999, Mavety acquired goaltender Andrew Raycroft in a trade with the Sudbury Wolves. The stellar goaltending from Raycroft helped the Frontenacs to an impressive 38-22-5-3 record during the 1999-2000 season, as the club finished in fifth place in the Eastern Conference. In the post-season, the Frontenacs lost to the Sudbury Wolves in the Eastern Conference quarter-finals.

The Frontenacs slipped back into eighth place in the Eastern Conference during the 2000-01 season, as the team finished the season with a 28-28-11-1, earning 68 points. The club earned their fourth consecutive playoff berth since Mavety returned, however, Kingston was swept in the Eastern Conference quarter-finals by the Belleville Bulls.

Kingston began a rebuilding effort in the 2001-02, as many of their top players from the previous season graduated from junior hockey. Kingston slumped to a record of 18-37-9-4, earning 49 points, which placed them into an eighth place tie with the North Bay Centennials, forcing a one-game tie-breaker between the two clubs. The Frontenacs took a 2–0 lead into the third period of the game, however, the Centennials responded back with six unanswered goals, defeating Kingston 6-2 and making it the first time that the club had failed to qualify for the post-season since the 1991-92 season.

Mavety began the 2002-03 as the Frontenacs head coach, however, after a dismal 10-18-0-3 record after 31 games, Mavety resigned as head coach, focusing solely on his general manager duties. Assistant coach Greg Bignell was named the interim head coach for the club. Kingston finished the season with a 25-37-2-4 record, earning 56 points, however, the club finished in ninth place in the Eastern Conference, failing to qualify for the post-season for the second consecutive season.

During the off-season in 2003, Mavety named Jim Hulton as the new head coach of the team. Hulton had previously worked as the head coach of the Belleville Bulls for three seasons, from 2000 to 2003. The Frontenacs returned to the post-season during the 2003-04, as the club finished the season with a 30-28-7-3 record, earning 70 points and fifth place in the Eastern Conference. The Frontenacs lost to the Barrie Colts in the Eastern Conference quarter-finals in five games.

The Frontenacs slumped during the 2004-05, as the club finished the season with a 28-33-4-3 record, earning 63 points and failing to qualify for the post-season for the third time in four seasons with a ninth-place finish in the Eastern Conference.

Kingston broke out in the 2005-06, as the Frontenacs finished the season with a 37-24-7 record, earning 81 points and finishing in fourth place in the Eastern Conference. In the opening round of the post-season, the Frontenacs were viewed as favourites to defeat the Sudbury Wolves, however, the Wolves defeated Kingston in six games, extending Kingston's playoff drought to eight seasons without a series victory. Following the season, Mavety fired head coach Jim Hulton and hired former Washington Capitals head coach Bruce Cassidy as his replacement.

The Frontenacs were expected to improve on their previous season, however, in 2006-07, the Frontenacs finished the season with a 31-30-7 record, earning 69 points, which was a 12-point decrease from the previous season. Kingston finished in fifth place in the Eastern Conference and lost to the Oshawa Generals in five games in the Eastern Conference quarter-finals.

In 2007-08, after the Frontenacs started the season with a poor 2-9-1 record in their first 12 games, Mavety relieved Bruce Cassidy of his duties, as he named himself the head coach of the club for the remainder of the season. Under Mavety, the Frontenacs earned a 23-32-1 record, bringing their overall record to 25-41-2, as the club failed to qualify for the post-season after finishing in ninth place in the Eastern Conference.

Mavety remained as the Frontenacs head coach at the start of the 2008-09 season, however, after a 5-13-5 start to the season, he once again resigned as head coach of the Frontenacs to focus solely on his general manager duties. Mavety named former NHL player and Kingston-native Doug Gilmour as head coach of the team. Gilmour had been an assistant coach with the Toronto Marlies of the American Hockey League to start the 2008–09 season. Under Gilmour, the rebuilding club earned a record of 13-27-5 record, as Kingston finished with an overall record of 18-40-10, finishing in tenth place in the Eastern Conference, missing the playoffs for a second consecutive season.

Kingston improved dramatically during the 2009-10 season, as the club earned a 33-30-5 record, earning 71 points, and fourth place in the Eastern Conference. In the post-season, the Frontenacs and the Brampton Battalion played a thrilling seven-game series in the Eastern Conference quarter-finals, however, the Battalion defeated the Frontenacs 5–2 in the seventh game of the series, eliminating Kingston from the playoffs.

The Frontenacs were considered contenders for the 2010-11, however, Kingston struggled with injuries and slumped to a 29-30-9 record during the regular season, earning 67 points and a fifth-place finish in the Eastern Conference standings. In the post-season, the Oshawa Generals easily defeated the Frontenacs in five games in the Eastern Conference quarter-finals.

Following the 2010–11 season, Mavety stepped down as the Frontenacs general manager, as Doug Gilmour was named to replace him. Mavety has remained with the Frontenacs until his death in 2020. His last position with the team was senior consultant.

Coaching record

Death 
Mavety died in Kingston on December 4, 2020,  at the age of 78.

References

External links

1942 births
2020 deaths
Vancouver Canucks (WHL) players
Los Angeles Sharks players
Philadelphia Blazers players
Chicago Cougars players
Toronto Toros players
Denver Spurs (WHA) players
Denver Spurs (WHL) players
Indianapolis Racers players
Belleville Bulls coaches
Kingston Frontenacs coaches
People from Woodstock, Ontario
Canadian ice hockey defencemen
Canadian ice hockey coaches